An election for 19 of the 60 seats in Seanad Éireann, the Senate of the Irish Free State, was held on 17 September 1925. The election was by single transferable vote, with the entire state forming a single 19-seat electoral district. There were 76 candidates on the ballot paper, whom voters ranked by preference.  Of the two main political parties, the larger (Cumann na nGaedheal) did not formally endorse any candidates, while the other (Sinn Féin, whose TDs were abstentionist) boycotted the election.  Voter turnout was low and the outcome was considered unsatisfactory. Subsequently, senators were selected by the Oireachtas rather than the electorate.

Vacancies
Under the provisions of the 1922 Constitution of the Irish Free State, Senators were to be elected for twelve-year terms, with the 60 Senators divided into four cohorts of 15, and an election every three years for one of the cohorts. As part of the initial transitional measures, 30 of the original 60 Senators in 1922 were selected by the Dáil, of whom the last 15 to secure election formed the cohort whose term would end after the first triennial period. As well as this cohort, four further Senators were required to vacate their seats: these had been temporarily co-opted to fill casual vacancies which had arisen in previous years.

Candidates
There were three methods of being included on the ballot. Outgoing Senators could nominate themselves for re-election, and all 19 did so. The Seanad could nominate a number of candidates equal to the number of vacancies (19), and the Dáil could nominate twice the number of vacancies (38). Both Dáil and Seanad selections were by single transferable vote and secret ballot. The minimum age for Senators was 35 years.

The Seanad resolved on 30 April to form a committee to decide procedure for its nominations; the committee drafted a resolution in June, which was amended and passed by the Seanad on 19 June. 29 applicants contested the Seanad nominations on 1 July. Apart from two Labour Party members, the candidates were Independents. 47 of the 60 Senators voted, including 18 of the 19 who were themselves standing for re-election. Donal O'Sullivan, clerk of the Seanad throughout its existence, suggests that these 18 had an incentive to vote for less popular candidates since the nominees would be rivals in the ensuing election. O'Sullivan describes the results as "a very great disappointment ... the list [of successful candidates] could not compare with the list of the ten rejected." Oliver St. John Gogarty made a similar remark in the Seanad itself after the results were announced.

The rejected ten were: David Barry, general manager of the British and Irish Steam Packet Company; Sir Laurence Grattan Esmonde, brother of Senator Thomas Grattan Esmonde, Bart; Lady Gregory; John J. Horgan; Hugh A. Law; John McCann, a stockbroker; The McGillicuddy of the Reeks; William Lombard Murphy, son of William Martin Murphy and proprietor of the Irish Independent; Sir John Harley Scott, a Unionist former Mayor of Cork; and J.J. Stafford, a County Wexford businessman.

Cumann na nGaedheal, the party which backed the incumbent government, decided not to formally support any candidates as a result of internal divisions. There was tension between ministers, backbenchers, and grassroots members, and between factions of Kevin O'Higgins and W. T. Cosgrave. The 1924 Army Mutiny had shaken the year-old party, and the appointment of public servants to lead the new state's institutions created resentment among those passed over. The parliamentary party held two selection conventions, on 2 and 6 July 1925, and when the leadership's candidates did badly a free vote was offered in the Dáil with all candidates nominally endorsed by the party.

The Dáil nominations were decided on 8 July. 57 candidates contested; 101 TDs voted, with one ballot deemed ineligible. 52 TDs did not vote, including all 44 abstentionist Sinn Féin TDs, who were ineligible to vote as they had not taken the Oath of Allegiance. TDs supported candidates on party lines. Of the 38 successful nominees, O'Sullivan classifies 21 as supporters of the Cumann na nGaedheal Government, 9 as Independent, 5 as in the Farmers' Party, and 3 as in the Labour Party. Four of the ten candidates rejected by the Seanad were also among the Dáil candidates, with John J. Horgan securing a nomination at the second attempt.

Campaign
The usual Irish local, personal canvassing strategy was impractical across a nationwide constituency, leading to a relatively quiet campaign. While the Farmers' Party and Labour produced newspaper advertisements for their respective slates of candidates, Cumann na nGaedheal did not at a national level formally endorse candidates, even those its TDs had nominated. It presented the election as nonpartisan. It published a booklet, Who's who in the 1925 Senate Election, and did not oppose candidates "put forward by any of the elements that accept the State and Constitution", i.e. other than republicans opposed to the Anglo-Irish Treaty.

Numerous interest groups produced lists of approved candidates, including doctors, publicans, motorists, ex-servicemen's associations, and the livestock trade. Candidates endorsed by temperance groups fared badly. The Catholic Truth Society circulated, to little effect, a list of outgoing Senators it condemned for not having opposed a controversial motion pertaining to divorce.

Sinn Féin, under the leadership of Éamon de Valera, called for a boycott of the election. Sinn Féin had not boycotted the 1923 Dáil election, but rather contested it on an abstentionist platform.  De Valera would later lead his Fianna Fáil party, founded in 1926, into the Oireachtas after the June 1927 Dáil election.

Election
The election was by single transferable vote, with the entire Irish Free State forming a single, 19-seat constituency. All citizens over 30 had a vote.  Since the voting age for Dáil and local elections was 21, a separate electoral roll was maintained for the Seanad election.

The Electoral (Seanad Elections) Act, 1925 was passed to allow the ballot to be presented as four parallel columns of 19 names rather than a single long column of all 76.

The low voter turnout was blamed on the Sinn Féin boycott, wet weather across the country, and the shorter than usual hours of polling. Turnout varied widely, from 8.2% in Mayo North to 43% in Monaghan. Another factor was the large, intimidating ballot paper; O'Sullivan describes it as "a fiasco", saying it was unreasonable to expect voters to "make an intelligent choice of nineteen persons from a list containing seventy-six names, most of which they had never seen or heard of before."

Results

Counting
The ballots were initially collected to one centre within each Dáil constituency to count and sort the first-preference votes. This took almost a week. On 25 September, the ballots were sent to Dublin, the totals checked centrally, and redistribution of transfers begun. Initially there were 10 count officials, rising to 40 by the end.  On 5 October, the first candidate was returned, on the 45th count. Counting continued until 19 October.

Harold Gosnell said that there was more news coverage of the count than of the preceding campaign: "the counting of the ballots under [STV] applied on a national scale attracts wide attention, and the results are sure to reflect the opinions (or lack of them) manifested by the electors".

Details
Although the election was national, many of the candidates relied on local support: 23 gained more than half their first preferences from their own constituency. Almost 12% (37,714) of valid ballots were exhausted (supported no successful candidate).

Candidates of the two parties contesting the election, Labour and the Farmers', did relatively well. Some interest groups also did well – vintners, ex-servicemen. Others did not  — doctors, academics, women, and especially Irish language revivalists: all four candidates supported by the Gaelic League lost, including outgoing senator and future president Douglas Hyde.

Ex-Unionist candidates did not fare well, even though the original design of the Seanad was intended in part to provide enhanced representation for the unionist minority.

Notes

Legacy
The shortcomings of the 1925 election created a consensus that a single national constituency was unworkable. Political scientist Harold Foote Gosnell wrote of the election, "the ballot is a confusing one and the size of the constituency makes electioneering difficult." In 1928, in the lead-up to the next triennial Seanad election, the Oireachtas formed a joint committee to change the selection procedures. While some members favoured retaining some form of voting by the general electorate, Fianna Fáil in particular wanted to ensure the Seanad was subordinate to the Dáil by restricting the franchise to Oireachtas members. This was effected by a constitutional amendment enacted on 23 July and an electoral act on 25 October. Thus, the 1925 election remains the only Seanad popular election.

See also
Members of the 1925 Seanad

References

Sources

Citations

External links

 
1925 in Irish politics
Seanad
Seanad Éireann elections
September 1925 events